Kitchen Super Star is a 2013-2015 Indian-Tamil language Cooking reality show that aired on Vijay TV from 2013 to 7 February 2015 on every Saturday at 8:00PM (IST). The Show is hosted by Tamil Film Actor Suresh and Chefs Dr. Dhamu and Venkatesh Bhat are the judges of this show.

Myna Nandhini won the season.

Seasons
The show was a 6 Seasons Telecast on Vijay TV
 Kitchen Super Star (season 1)
 Kitchen Super Star (season 2)
 Kitchen Super Star (season 3)
 Kitchen Super Star (season 4)
 Kitchen Super Star Junior
 Kitchen Super Star Doubles

Season 01

Season 02
The second season of the Kitchen Super Star (season 2) aired from 27 April 2014 on every Saturday at 8:00PM (IST). The finalists were Harita, Maheshwari Chanakyan, Bala Anandh, Susan, Priya and Sindhu Shyam. The winner of the show is Sindhu Shyam.

Season 03
The third season of the Kitchen Super Star (season 2) aired from 2 August 2014 to 7 February 2015 on every Saturday at 8:00PM (IST) for 27 Episodes. The show winner is Saravanan Meenatchi (season 2) Fame Nandhini.

Season 04
 
The third season of the Kitchen Super Star (season 4) aired from 14 February 2014 to 11 July 2015 on every Saturday at 8:00PM (IST) for 22 Episodes. The show winner is Jeniffer and Travline.

References

External links
Star Vijay US

2014 Indian television seasons
2015 Indian television seasons